The 4th Cavalry Brigade is an AC/RC unit based at Fort Knox, Kentucky. The unit is responsible for training selected United States Army Reserve & National Guard units that are based East of the Mississippi River. The brigade was originally formed as an element of the 2nd Cavalry Division but was inactivated after the division was broken up. The unit was formerly designated as 4th Brigade, 85th Division. The brigade is a subordinate unit of the 1st Army.

Organization

World War II organization
 Headquarters and Headquarters Troop, 4th Cavalry Brigade
  9th Cavalry Regiment (Cld)
 10th Cavalry Regiment (Cld)
 28th Cavalry Regiment (Cld)

Current Organization
The unit is composed of:
 Headquarters and Headquarters Troop, 4th Cavalry Brigade
 3rd Battalion, 337th Regiment (Training Support Battalion)
 2nd Battalion, 340th Regiment (Training Support Battalion)
 3rd Battalion, 383rd Regiment (Training Support Battalion
 1st Battalion, 409th Regiment (Brigade Engineer Battalion)
 3rd Battalion, 409th Regiment (Brigade Support Battalion)
 4th Battalion, 409th Regiment (Brigade Support Battalion)
 1st Battalion, 410th Regiment (Brigade Engineer Battalion)
 2nd Battalion, 410th Regiment (Field Artillery)(Cannon)
 4th Battalion, 410th Regiment (Brigade Support Battalion)
 1st Battalion, 411th Regiment (Logistics Support Battalion)

Lineage
Constituted 25 August 1942 in the Army of the United States as Headquarters, 4th Tank Destroyer Group

Activated 1 September 1942 at Camp Hood, Texas

Inactivated 26 October 1945 at Fort Jackson, South Carolina

Disbanded 5 August 1952

Reconstituted 24 October 1997 in the Regular Army as Headquarters, 4th Cavalry Brigade, and activated at Fort Knox, Kentucky

Inactivated 16 October 1999 at Fort Knox, Kentucky

Activated 1 December 2006 at Fort Knox, Kentucky

Unit decorations

Campaign participation credit

References

The Brigade, A History by John J. McGrath from the Combat Studies Institute Press, Fort Leavenworth, Kansas.

External links
 Brigade Homepage
 4th Cavalry Brigade at Global Security
 Division East (1st Army)
 4/85th Division at Global Security

004
Military units and formations established in 1915